Pronominalization in Bengali is a 1983 published version of a thesis about Bengali grammar written in English by linguistic Humayun Azad. The writing was started in 1976, during his doctoral in Edinburgh, Scotland. The book was initially published by the University of Dhaka in 1983, and in 2010 it was published by Agamee Prakashani, Dhaka.

This research was published under the author's birth name Humayun Kabir by the University of Edinburgh in 1976, after he changed his name to Humayun Azad in 1988, it was re-published under the new name. Scottish linguist Keith Brown was the supervisor of this doctoral thesis.

Synopsis
This work is the first research into the syntax of pronouns in Standard Colloquial Bengali using a transformational generative model of syntax. Several models referred to as an adaptation from Noam Chomsky's Aspects of the Theory of Syntax (1965).

References

External links
 Pronominalization in Bengali at Edinburgh Research Archive
 Pronominalization in Bengali at British Library

Pronominalization in Bengali at Open Library

1983 non-fiction books
Bengali grammar
Bangladeshi non-fiction books
Bangladeshi books
Theses
Books by Humayun Azad
University of Dhaka
University of Edinburgh